Glenea subsimilis is a species of beetle in the family Cerambycidae. It was described by Charles Joseph Gahan in 1897. It is known from India, Vietnam, Laos and China. It contains the varietas Glenea subsimilis var. rubripes.

References

subsimilis
Beetles described in 1897